Von Mensch zu Mensch (German for From Person to Person) is the tenth and final studio album by the German band Unheilig, which was released on November 4, 2016



Track listing

Limited Deluxe DVD Track Listing

Ein Letztes Mal Tournee 2016

May, 13 - Bad Segeberg, Germany - Freilichttheater am Kalkberg
June, 3 - Hannover, Germany - Gilde Parkbühne
June, 4 - Zwickau, Germany - Flugplatz Zwickau
June, 19 - Munich, Germany - Königplatz
June, 25 - Baunatal, Germany - Parkstadion
June, 30 - Straubing, Germany - Bluetone Festival
July, 1 -  Graz, Austria - Freiluftarena B (Messe)
July, 2 - Vienna, Austria - Krieau Open Air
July, 15 - Rostock, Germany - IGA Park
July, 16 - Berlin, Germany - Kindl Bühne Wuhlheide
July, 22 - Emmendingen, Germany - IEM Music Festival
July, 23 - Erfurt, Germany - Freigelände Messehalle Erfurt
July, 24 - Aspach, Germany - Mechatronik Arena
July, 29 - Norderney, Germany - Summertime at Norderney
July, 30 - Saarbrücken, Germany - Messe
July, 31 - Weinheim, Germany - Schlosspark
August, 5 - Rothenburg ob der Tauber, Germany - Eisweise
August, 6 - Dresden - Filmnächte am Elbufer
August, 12 - Mönchengladbach, Germany - SparkassenPark Mönchengladbach
August, 13 - Coburg, Germany - HUK Coburg Open Air Sommer
August, 20 - Ulm, Germany - Kloster Wiblingen
August, 27 - Magdeburg, Germany - Domplatz
September, 2 - Bremerhaven - Open Air Wilhelm-Kaisen-Platz
September, 3 - Ochtrup, Germany - Sportplatz Alte Maate
September, 10 - Köln, Germany - RheinEnergieStadion

Certifications and sales

Charts

References

Unheilig albums
2016 albums